In his "A New Beginning" speech on June 4, 2009, at Cairo University in Cairo, Egypt, President of the United States Barack Obama stated that "I've come here to Cairo to seek a new beginning between the United States and Muslims around the world, one based on mutual interest and mutual respect, and one based upon the truth that America and Islam are not exclusive and need not be in competition.  Instead, they overlap, and share common principles – principles of justice and progress; tolerance and the dignity of all human beings."  During the speech, he also committed to "host a Summit on Entrepreneurship this year to identify how we can deepen ties between business leaders, foundations and social entrepreneurs in the United States and Muslim communities around the world".

To support the President's "New Beginning" goals, United States Secretary of State Hillary Clinton launched Partners for a New Beginning along with former Secretary of State Madeleine Albright, Walter Isaacson (President of The Aspen Institute), and Muhtar Kent (chairman and CEO of The Coca-Cola Company) on April 27, 2010. Leading the initiative on the State Department side is Kris Balderston, Special Representative for Global Partnerships.

Background 

In an official signing ceremony in conjunction with the Presidential Summit on Entrepreneurship on April 27, 2010, the U.S. Department of State entered into a partnership with Partners for a New Beginning (PNB) - a group of eminent Americans from a variety of sectors who will reach out systematically to private sector entities at the highest level to harness private sector resources and capabilities to advance New Beginning programs and goals.  This partnership was officially announced during Secretary Clinton's remarks at the close of the Presidential Summit on Entrepreneurship.

As Secretary Clinton explained at the Presidential Summit on Entrepreneurship, "For example, they might reach out to companies to provide equipment and technology for the Scientific Centers of Excellence overseas, or help launch internships and mentoring programs for emerging business leaders, or encourage angel investors in this country to partner with angel investors abroad. Through collaborations like these, Partners for a New Beginning will deepen ties between our people and institutions, and give more Americans the chance to contribute to this common endeavor."

Steering committee members
On September 22, 2010, PNB inaugurated the full PNB Steering Committee and announced the following commitment:

Video from the Clinton Global Initiative Commitment: https://www.youtube.com/watch?v=Fqlfb9QsD98

PNB is chaired by Madeleine K. Albright, chair of Albright Stonebridge Group, and she is joined by PNB Vice Chairs Muhtar Kent, chairman and CEO of the Coca-Cola Company, and Walter Isaacson, president and CEO of the Aspen Institute.  The PNB Steering Committee members are as follows:
 Tarek Abdel-Meguid, founding partner, Parella Weinberg Partners
 David Arkless, president of global corporate and government affairs, ManpowerGroup
 Jean Case, chief executive officer, The Case Foundation
 John Chambers, chairman and CEO, Cisco Systems, Inc.
 Kenneth Cohen, chairman, ExxonMobil Foundation; vice president of public affairs, Exxon Mobil Corporation
Henrietta H. Fore, chairman and CEO, Holsman International
 Helene Gayle, president and CEO, CARE USA
 Stephen B. Heintz, president, Rockefeller Brothers Fund
 Andrew Liveris, president, chairman, and CEO, Dow Chemical Company
 John Mack, former chairman and CEO, Morgan Stanley
 Christopher J. Nassetta, president and CEO, Hilton Worldwide
 Paul Otellini, president and CEO, Intel Corporation
 Eboo Patel, founder and executive director, Interfaith Youth Core
 Ruth Simmons, president, Brown University

Members at Large

On Tuesday, May 31 2011, the Aspen Institute announced the following members at large – organizations committed to working with other partners and PNB Local Chapters to carry out targeted and set revenue-generating and/or philanthropic commitments for the benefit of Muslim communities in PNB targeted countries. 

Members at large include: 

 The Arab American Institute
 Bamyan Media
 Craig Newmark
 IBM
 International Youth Foundation and The MasterCard Foundation
 New York Academy of Sciences
 PeacePlayers International
 Sawari Ventures
 Souktel
 SREN
 Tanenbaum Center for Interreligious Understanding
 Tomorrow's Youth Organization
 Tony Blair Faith Foundation
 Turkish Philanthropy Funds
 University of the People
 WillowTree Impact Investors
 World Cocoa Foundation 
 World Congress of Muslim Philanthropists

Statements of support

President Obama, during his visit to Jakarta, Indonesia, on November 9, 2010,  stated that "Many of the partnerships I’ve mentioned are a direct result of my call in Cairo for a new beginning between the United States and Muslim communities around the world.  And it involves the private sector as well, thanks to efforts like Partners for a New Beginning, which is forging partnerships around science, education and entrepreneurship."

Secretary of State Hillary Clinton, during the launch of PNB at the White House on April 27, 2010, said, "I think that this is one of those occasions in the diplomatic history of our country that we will look back on and say that that made a difference.... Partners for a New Beginning will tap into the dynamism and innovation of U.S. industry in a number of ways—for example, by encouraging companies to contribute equipment or technology to the Centers of Scientific Excellence we are developing overseas, or by facilitating partnerships between universities here and those abroad to share knowledge and improve business education. They will also encourage investors and mentors in the United States to recognize the tremendous potential that resides in Muslim-majority communities, where many entrepreneurs are working against significant obstacles to turn their dreams into reality."

Former Secretary of State Madeleine Albright, during the launch of PNB at the White House on April 27, 2010, said, "These projects can go much further to strengthening the bonds between the United States and the citizens of Muslim-majority nations, and to do so based on a philosophy – and I think we should keep repeating these words – mutual understanding, mutual interests, and mutual respect... I did learn ... the real importance about public-private partnerships and the great difference that can be made when businesses get involved with nongovernmental organizations and the government in order to really propel issues forward."

Assistant secretary of state for economic and business affairs Jose Fernandez, wrote in the Wall Street Journal, "America's culture of entrepreneurship is not only one of our country's greatest assets, it's one of our easiest exports to sell… Our North African partnership supports the development of such an entrepreneurial culture by connecting entrepreneurs, investors, universities and foundations in the U.S. and the Maghreb. It also fosters ministerial policy dialogues—about best practices, increased economic integration and the like—between U.S. and North African officials. Our goal is to build a network that will include 100,000 people in the Maghreb in the next five years. We want to help turn the social drive that fueled the Arab Spring into an entrepreneurial fire that fulfills its aspirations by creating jobs."

See also
 E-Mentor Corps and ImagineNations Group
 Presidential Summit on Entrepreneurship
 Aspen Institute

Notes and references

External links

International development organizations